Outerra is a Slovak computer software company best known for its middleware 3D planetary graphics engine, called Outerra engine, in development since 2008. The engine renders high-quality terrain, terrain texturing, flora and water flow normal maps using relatively sparse and highly compressed data through fractal processing and other types of procedural generation. The game Anteworld uses real world data to create a virtual replica of planet Earth.

Features 
Features of the engine and its tech-demo Anteworld include:

 Fractal refinement of preexisting terrain data
 Support of vector-based data, such as roads
 Seamless transitioning from outer space to planet surface
 Chromium browser integration
 Land vehicle physics and JSBSim flight dynamics model library for aircraft physics
 Unlimited visibility
 Dynamic and adjustable time flow
 FreeTrack support
 FBX importer and export of models in self-installing OTX format
 Oculus Rift support

Anteworld 

The developers of Outerra in 2012 released an alpha tech-demo for the engine called Anteworld (the name comes from the Latin prefix Ante-, meaning prior-to in time - "A world that was") that consists of a digital replica of the whole planet Earth at a 1:1 scale. The virtual world can be explored in a free-camera mode as well as in vehicles such as planes, boats and cars. It also features a first person walking mode. For the mirror world real world data was used - ingame the user can blend in an embedded Google Maps of real Earth that is synchronized with the current camera position. Since June 2013 Anteworld provides support for Oculus Rift. Furthermore, user-made objects such as houses and vehicles can be spawned and used in the sandbox game. While the tech-demo is free some features require an upgrade to the $15 full version. An accompanying novella that is loosely tied to the game written by C. Shawn Smith is planned as well.

Middle-Earth DEM Project 
In 2013 a separate non-profit motivated group of hobbyists released a first version of terrain data of Middle-Earth compiled for Outerra. The goal of this digital elevation model project, which was launched by Oshyan Greene and Carl Lingard in 2006, is what they summarize as a "living, breathing Middle Earth" - a highly detailed model which includes rivers, vegetation, buildings, roads and subterranean features. The sources for the maps include Tolkien's maps (such as the ones in The Lord of the Rings and The Silmarillion), Strachey's Journeys of Frodo, Fonstad's The Atlas of Middle-earth, the locations used in Peter Jackson's movies as well as fan made maps.

Virtual Mars 
In February 2014 the developers announced ongoing development, which was planned since October 2009, to add another planet to the two already existing ones (Earth and the fictional Middle-Earth) – Mars. Additionally in 2014 they stated that "ultimately the whole solar system should be accessible" in a single game on Twitter.

TitanIM 
TitanIM (Titan Integrated Military) is an Outerra-based military simulation platform that was revealed in December 2014 at the world's largest modeling, simulation and training conference oriented at military use, I/ITSEC in Orlando. TitanIM was granted exclusive license to the Outerra engine for military use. The initial public release version of the software is known as Titan Vanguard.

References

Further reading
 Maloof, Blake (Mar. 6, 2012) "Earth's Digital Doppelganger", Make.
 Rose, Mike (Jan. 31, 2014) "Outerra: A seamless planet rendering engine", Gamasutra.
 Templeton, Graham (Feb. 6, 2014) "Outerra: The seamless planet rendering engine that could change open-world games ", Geek.com.

External links
 
 
 /r/Outerra - Subreddit for the engine and Anteworld
 User submitted mods

Video game engines
Virtual globes
Virtual reality companies
Video game companies of Slovakia
Video game development companies